Flint Hill is an unincorporated community in Talbot County, in the U.S. state of Georgia.

History
The community's name is a reference to the Flint River.

References

Unincorporated communities in Talbot County, Georgia
Unincorporated communities in Georgia (U.S. state)